Stenosmylinae is a subfamily of neotropical osmylid.

Genera
Genera accepted within Stenosmylinae include:
 Isostenosmylus Navás, 1912
 Phymatosmylus Adams, 1969

References

Neuroptera
Insect subfamilies